Ageniellini, known as the mud-nesting spider wasps, is a tribe of spider wasps in the subfamily Pepsinae.

Description
The Ageniellini are slender-bodied spider wasps. They are distinguished from most other Pompilidae by their petiolate abdominal structure and typical absence of a transverse carina on the first segment of the gaster. These traits are, however, shared with Melanagenia of the tribe Pepsini, which is separated by the lack of malar space, deep lateral sulcus of the pronotum, and wing venation.

Distribution
The tribe Ageniellini is cosmopolitan.

Behavior
Members of Ageniellini have one of three lifestyles that either invade the nests of other spider wasp nests as kleptoparasites, build their own nests in dry soil, or build thimble-shaped nests out of mud. The most common of these nesting strategies is building mud nests, which are frequently communal in contrast to most other spider wasp groups. As typical of the rest of the family, the Ageniellini provision their nests with a single spider and then lay an egg on it. Most of the species remove the legs of their spider prey before bringing it to the nest.

Genera
There are 16 genera within Ageniellini.

 Ageniella Banks, 1912
 Atopagenia Wasbauer, 1987
 Auplopus Spinola, 1841
 Cyemagenia Arnold, 1946
 Dichragenia Haupt, 1950
 Eragenia Banks, 1946
 Dimorphagenia Evans, 1973
 Machaerothrix Haupt, 1938
 Macromerella Banks, 1934
 Macromeris Lepeletier, 1831
 Paragenia Bingham, 1896
 Phanagenia Banks, 1933
 Mystacagenia Evans, 1973
 Phanochilus  Banks, 1944
 Poecilagenia Haupt, 1926
 Priocnemella Banks, 1925

References

Pepsinae
Hymenoptera tribes